The Erlspitze Group, also called the Seefeld Group, is the southwesternmost side range of the Austrian part of the Karwendel mountains in the Alps. It forms a horseshoe-shaped highland around the valley of Eppzirler Tal and is joined in the south to the Nordkette by the Erl Saddle (Erlsattel) near Solsteinhaus. It is bounded in the west by the Seefeld Basin, in the east by the valleys of the Gleirschtal and the Großes Kristental; its forested northern foothills reach as far as Scharnitz.

Unlike the four main ranges of the Karwendel, the Erlspitze Group is made of Main Dolomite. Typical of this rock are bizarre weathering forms, like towers, pinnacles and sharply formed arêtes as well as rock arches and caves as a consequence of the rapid erosion of individual rock strata.

Its valley bases are Hochzirl, Reith, Seefeld and Scharnitz, all of which are on the Innsbruck-Mittenwald section of the Mittenwald Railway.

Two alpine club huts act as bases for tours in the area of the  Erlspitze Group: in the west is the Nördlinger Hut and, in the south, is the  Solsteinhaus. In the northern part of the Erlspitze Group are two huts open in summer: the Oberbrunnalm and, in the Eppzirler Tal, the Eppzirler Alm.

Important peaks (by height)
 Erlspitze
 Reither Spitze
 Freiungen
 Kuhljochspitze
 Härmelekopf
 Seefelder Spitze
 Fleischbanktürme
 Fleischbankspitze
 Karlspitze
 Seefelder Joch
 Zischgenkopf
 Zäunlkopf

Literature 
 Walter Klier: Alpine Club Guide Karwendel alpin. 15th edn., Bergverlag Rudolf Rother, Munich, 2005. .

Mountain ranges of the Alps
Mountain ranges of Tyrol (state)
Karwendel